Casa Colorada is a dacitic volcanic dome complex erupted 17 million years ago. The complex formed in three stages, involving a tuff ring, lava domes and dacitic lava flows. It is constructed on red beds and a basement of Ordovician age. The main dome is dated 17.3 mya by potassium–argon dating. The main minerals are biotite, hornblende, feldspar and quartz; oxide minerals are also present.

See also 
Altiplano–Puna volcanic complex

References 

Volcanoes of Jujuy Province
Miocene lava domes